Dance Mode! is the second soundtrack album of the Australian animated television series Bluey, which is scheduled for release on 21 April 2023 by Demon Records. The program itself first aired ABC Kids on 1 October 2018. The show follows Bluey, an anthropomorphic six-year-old Blue Heeler puppy who is characterised by her abundance of energy, imagination and curiosity of the world. Most of the soundtrack's music was composed and performed by Joff Bush, the composer for the television program, alongside a team of musicians.

The soundtrack will be released through Demon Music Group, a subdivision of BBC Studios, who hold global rights to release the show's music. The first single, "Dance Mode", was released on 27 January 2023.

Background and composition
Joff Bush serves as the primary composer of Bluey, writing half of the television show's score himself and leading a group of additional composers, including David Barber. Bush graduated from the Queensland Conservatorium, where he met executive producer Daley Pearson, and before Bluey, worked on series such as The Family Law and Australian Survivor. Bush has stated that each episode has its own unique musical style, and he likes to become involved in the episodes as they are scripted; he regularly has detailed discussions with series creator Joe Brumm. Live instruments are regularly played for the recordings. Every episode of Bluey is individually scored, a decision made by Brumm, who was inspired by the original compositions for Charlie and Lola while working on the series in the United Kingdom.

Bush recorded a soundtrack for the first series of the program, titled Bluey: The Album, which was released on 22 January 2021. The soundtrack debuted at number one on the ARIA Albums Chart in February 2021. It was recognised as the first children's album to reach the top of the charts in Australia. It won Best Children's Album at the 2021 ARIA Music Awards, and an APRA Screen Music Award for Best Soundtrack Album in 2021.

Dance Mode! features songs from the first, second and third series of Bluey. The first half of the album contains upbeat and silly songs, while the second half contains quieter and reflective tracks. "Dance Mode" is describe as an upbeat, EDM style song, while "Army" and "Grandad" lean into the bluegrass genre with banjo and whistle instrumentation.

Release
It was reported in January 2023 that the soundtrack, entitled Dance Mode!, would contain 17 songs and be released in 2023. The first single, "Dance Mode", was released on 27 January 2023.

The album was officially announced on 27 January 2023, with pre-orders opening on the same day. The album will be released on 21 April 2023 on CD, streaming services, and orange vinyl.

Track listing

References

2023 soundtrack albums
Demon Music Group albums
Soundtracks by Australian artists
Television animation soundtracks
Bluey (2018 TV series)